Stephen Carr (born 29 August 1976) is an Irish former professional footballer who played for and captained Birmingham City from 2009 to 2013. He previously played for Premier League teams Tottenham Hotspur and, for a shorter spell, Newcastle United. He is a former international player with the Republic of Ireland. His primary position was right back, but had been known to deputise at left back or centre back when required.

Club career

Tottenham Hotspur
Carr was born in Dublin. As a fifteen-year-old, he went on trial from Stella Maris to Tottenham Hotspur and was signed up by then manager Ossie Ardiles. He made his debut for the club on 26 September 1993 away to Ipswich Town in the 1993–94 FA Premier League season. However he had to wait until the 1996–97 season to establish himself as a regular first-team player, when he made 28 appearances that campaign.

He picked up a League Cup medal with Spurs in 1999 after contributing to a 1–0 win over Leicester City in the final. The 1999–2000 season was arguably his best ever as far as his performances are concerned, as well as scoring a "thunderous piledriver" against champions Manchester United.

His reputation continued to grow throughout the 2000–01 season, and other clubs were beginning to show interest in signing him. However, in the summer of 2001, he began to have problems with his knee and required an operation which he underwent in September of that year. He did not make any appearances in the 2001–02 season and also missed the 2002 World Cup finals. It was not until October 2002 that Carr was back fully fit. As he returned to form, interest from other Premiership clubs started to resurface. Carr was linked with Manchester United, and a move to Newcastle United was on the cards.

Newcastle United
Carr signed for Newcastle United in August 2004 when then manager Bobby Robson signed him for a fee of £2 million on a four-year contract. Soon after he signed Robson was sacked from his managerial post by chairman Freddy Shepherd. He was replaced by Graeme Souness, who, like Robson, saw Carr as a first-team player. Carr's debut for the club came in a 2–2 draw against Middlesbrough on 14 August. He played in 26 league games in the 2004–05 season, scoring once. His first goal for the club came from a "fierce shot from well outside the area" against Southampton. He helped Newcastle reach the quarter-finals of the UEFA Cup and the semi-final of the FA Cup. Newcastle finished 14th, which put pressure on Souness.

In the 2005–06 season, he only managed to make 19 league appearances for the club as the persistent knee injury ruled him out for two months. The team finished 7th in the league under the new management of Glenn Roeder, after Souness was sacked in January.

Carr was one of the many injury victims during Newcastle's 2006–07 season and was out with a fractured foot for a few months. He returned for the 2–2 draw against West Ham United on 20 January 2007, filling in at an unfamiliar left-back position after impressive displays from Nolberto Solano at right-back during Carr's absence, putting question marks over his future at the club. He fell further down the pecking order during the 2007–08 season with the signings of Habib Beye and Geremi. Beye's impressive form and Carr's inability to maintain fitness resulted in Kevin Keegan deciding against renewing Carr's contract and he was released at the end of the season.

After Newcastle
Carr was linked with moves to Aston Villa, Everton, West Ham United, Wigan Athletic, Hertha Berlin, Racing Genk and Bohemians. He was also on trial with League One side Leicester City where he would have linked up with Nigel Pearson whom he played under at Newcastle. Having failed to find a suitable club, Carr announced his retirement from all forms of football on 1 December 2008.

Birmingham City

In February 2009 he began training with Birmingham City with a view to coming out of retirement, and signed a one-month contract with the club on 23 February. He made his debut the following day, playing the whole of the goalless draw away to Crystal Palace. After impressing during the initial month, Carr signed an extension until the end of the season. Following Birmingham's promotion to the Premier League, Carr signed a new two-year contract with the club. Made acting captain in the absence through injury and squad rotation of Lee Carsley, he was a member of the Birmingham team that went 15 games unbeaten in all competitions, including a club record 12 unbeaten in the top flight, during the 2009–10 Premier League season. Towards the end of the season Carr received a one-match suspension for improper conduct after making an "offensive gesture" towards Aston Villa supporters at the end of the local derby lost by Birmingham via a late, controversial penalty.

He captained the team to victory in the 2011 Football League Cup final as Birmingham defeated favourites Arsenal 2–1. Carr played every game of the 2010–11 Premier League season, at the end of which Birmingham were relegated to the Championship, and the club took up the option of retaining his services for another year.

Carr made his 100th appearance for Birmingham in the Europa League play-off round first leg against Portuguese club Nacional, the first time the club had participated in major European competition for nearly 50 years. He missed much of the second half of the 2011–12 season with knee cartilage damage, and his contract expired in June, but after the appointment of former Newcastle teammate Lee Clark as Birmingham's manager, he signed a one-year deal with the club. Investigation of an injury sustained in a pre-season friendly in August revealed knee damage requiring surgery predicted to keep him out for six months.

Carr was unable to play again, and at the end of the 2012–13 season he announced his retirement from football. Although Clark had hoped to persuade him to stay at Birmingham as a coach, Carr confirmed that he and his family intended to move to Spain where he had business interests.

International career
Carr has represented his country at schoolboy, youth, under-18, under-21 and full international levels. He missed out on the 2002 World Cup due to injury.

Carr initially retired from the international scene after the team failed to qualify for the 2006 World Cup, having played 39 times for his country. However he was convinced to continue playing international football by new Ireland manager Steve Staunton. Due to injuries and the sacking of Irish manager Staunton, Carr retired from international football on 14 November 2007.

Career statistics

Club

International

Honours
Tottenham Hotspur
Football League Cup: 1998–99

Newcastle United
UEFA Intertoto Cup: 2006

Birmingham City
Football League Cup: 2010–11

Individual
Premier League PFA Team of the Year: 2000–01, 2002–03
 Tottenham Hotspur Members Club Player of the Year: 1999, 2000

References

External links

1976 births
Association footballers from Dublin (city)
Living people
Association football defenders
Republic of Ireland association footballers
Republic of Ireland under-21 international footballers
Republic of Ireland international footballers
Tottenham Hotspur F.C. players
Newcastle United F.C. players
Birmingham City F.C. players
Premier League players
English Football League players
Republic of Ireland expatriate association footballers
Expatriate footballers in England
Irish expatriate sportspeople in England
Stella Maris F.C. players